Mike Mrowicki is an American politician who has served in the Vermont House of Representatives since 2009.

References

21st-century American politicians
Democratic Party members of the Vermont House of Representatives
Living people
Year of birth missing (living people)
Politicians from Jersey City, New Jersey